The Carolina Inn is a hotel listed on the National Register of Historic Places on the campus of the University of North Carolina at Chapel Hill in Orange County, North Carolina, which opened in 1924. The Carolina Inn is a member of Historic Hotels of America, the official program of the National Trust for Historic Preservation.

The original section of the hotel was built in 1923–1924 on the site of the chapel that gave the town of Chapel Hill its name.  Wings were added in 1939–1940, 1969–1970, and 1995.  Each section consists of two stories constructed in red brick topped by a gambrel roof with dormers. The front facade of the original section features a two-story piazza supported by six tall paneled wooden posts and a centrally-placed cupola atop this original block. The building is Colonial Revival in style, with Classical Revival design elements.  It was built by alumnus John Sprunt Hill and donated to the university in 1935.

It was managed by Doubletree from 1993 to 2007.

References

Sources

External links
 The Carolina Inn

Hotel buildings on the National Register of Historic Places in North Carolina
Colonial Revival architecture in North Carolina
Neoclassical architecture in North Carolina
Hotel buildings completed in 1924
Hotels established in 1924
University of North Carolina at Chapel Hill landmarks
National Register of Historic Places in Orange County, North Carolina
University of North Carolina at Chapel Hill buildings